Dunbar Creek is a  stream which is located in Fayette County, Pennsylvania. It flows into the Youghiogheny River at Connellsville.

History and features
According to the Geographic Names Information System, Dunbar Creek has also been known historically as:
New Haven and Dunber Cree

It is a noted trout stream, with a popular fly fishing-only section on its upper portions. The Pennsylvania Fish Commission stocks the stream with brown and brook trout. There are also some native brook trout located in its headwaters. The Budinsky hole is a popular fishing spot on the stream.

Course
Dunbar Creek rises in a pond at Jumonville, Pennsylvania, and then flows northerly along the west side of Chestnut Ridge to join the Youghiogheny River at Connellsville.

Watershed
Dunbar Creek drains  of area, receives about 48.3 in/year of precipitation, has a wetness index of 358.73, and is about 85% forested.

Natural history
The mouth of Dunbar Creek is the location of Dunbar Creek Confluence BDA. Here, there is a mature riverine forest and a scour habitat that provide habitat for a plant species of special concern.

References

Rivers of Pennsylvania
Rivers of Fayette County, Pennsylvania